The 2012 gubernatorial election in the Mexican state of Yucatán were held on Sunday, July 1, 2012. Incumbent Yucatán Governor Ivonne Ortega Pacheco of the Institutional Revolutionary Party (PRI) is retiring due to mandatory term limits, which limit all Mexican state governors to one, six-year term in office. The Yucatán gubernatorial election coincided with the 2012 Mexican presidential and general elections.

Candidates

References

2012 elections in Mexico
Gubernatorial elections in Mexico
Gubernatorial
Politics of Yucatán
July 2012 events in Mexico